Shelby County Airport  is a public airport located three miles (4.8 km) west of the central business district (CBD) of Shelbyville, a city in Shelby County, Illinois, United States. A significant amount of the airport's traffic is from agricultural aviation serving nearby areas.

Facilities 

 Runway 18/36: 4,098 x 75 ft. (1,249 x 23 m); surface: asphalt
 Runway 14/32: 2336 x 180 ft. (712 x 55 m); surface: turf
 Runway 4/22: 1446 x 180 ft. (441 x 55 m); surface: turf

There is one FBO at the airport. It offers self-service fuel as well as a lounge and courtesy car.

Aircraft
For the 12-month period ending August 31, 2019, the airport averages 44 aircraft operations per day, or about 16,000 per year. This is 97% general aviation and 3% military. For the same time period, there are 18 aircraft based on the field, all single-engine airplanes.

Accidents & Incidents
On April 1, 2000, an Aerotek PITTS S-2A crashed while attempting to land on 2H0's runway 14. The aircraft impacted a golf cart applying weed killer near the airport. The gold cart driver received fatal injuries. The probable cause of the crash was the pilot's improper touchdown point and runway alignment, with contributing factors including insufficient gold cart markings and the fact that the golf cart was not equipped with a radio. Additional factors include the fact that airport personnel neglected to issue NOTAMs to notify pilots that maintenance was ongoing.

References 
Airport Master Record (FAA Form 5010), also available as a printable form (PDF)

External links 

Airports in Illinois
Buildings and structures in Shelby County, Illinois